The Calypso Lemonade 200 was an ARCA Menards Series race held at the Winchester Speedway in Winchester, Indiana. It was originally 50 miles, then increased to 63 miles, then 75, then 100, then 125, and then back down to 100.

Past winners

ARCA Menards Series

 1994, 1997, 2003, 2006, 2021: Race extended due to a Green–white–checker finish.

References

External links 
 Racing-Reference.info – Winchester Speedway

ARCA Menards Series races
Motorsport in Indiana
Recurring sporting events disestablished in 2021